The Jezerane Viaduct is located between the Ogulin and Brinje interchanges of the A1 motorway in Croatia, just to the south of the Mala Kapela Tunnel.

At this location the motorway route follows a horizontal curve of  radius. The viaduct is a beam structure across a series of spans averaging . Due to its sheer size, the viaduct was designed in four segments comprising box girders and grillage systems and expansion joints atop three piers and both abutments. The piers comprise a box cross section, with 30 cm thick walls.

Traffic volume
Traffic is regularly counted and reported by Hrvatske autoceste, operator of the viaduct and the A1 motorway where the structure is located, and published by Hrvatske ceste. Substantial variations between annual (AADT) and summer (ASDT) traffic volumes are attributed to the fact that the bridge carries substantial tourist traffic to the Adriatic resorts. The traffic count is performed using analysis of motorway toll ticket sales.

See also
List of bridges by length

References

Box girder bridges
Bridges completed in 2004
Toll bridges in Croatia
Buildings and structures in Karlovac County
Viaducts in Croatia
Transport in Karlovac County